Len Strazewski (born February 16, 1955) is a comic book author who wrote Starman after Roger Stern. He has also worked on The Flash, Justice Society of America, Phantom Lady, The Fly, and many other titles for DC comics. He also worked on a comic version of Speed Racer for NOW Comics. His Street Fighter II comic for Malibu Comics was canceled after three issues by Capcom because of his choice to have Ken Masters murdered in the second issue. Also on Malibu, he wrote Prime, Elven and Prototype. He is a professor of journalism at Columbia College Chicago and a member of the school's Board of Trustees.

References

1955 births
American comics writers
American educators
Living people